Braunlich or Bräunlich is a German surname meaning "brownish". Notable people with the surname include:
Friedrich Gustav Bräunlich (1800-1875), German physician on medical psychology
Alice Braunlich (1888–1989), American classical philologist
Erich Bräunlich (1892–1945), German orientist
Egon Arno Bräunlich (1919–2001), German painter and pharmacist
Helmut Braunlich (1929–2013), German-American violinist, composer and musicologist
Hans Bräunlich (born 1940), German dramaturge
Tom Braunlich (born 1958), American CCG designer
René Bräunlich (born 1974), German engineer from Leipzig, a victim of the kidnapping in Iraq, 2006 along with Thomas Nitzschke

German-language surnames